Morgan Morgans (October 23, 1806 – May 20, 1889) was a member of the Connecticut Senate representing the 12th District from 1863 to 1865 and a member of the Connecticut House of Representatives from 1862 to 1863. In 1852, he was the Whig Party candidate for mayor of New York City.

He was born in New York City in East Broadway on October 23, 1806.

He was a profitable brass founder and added to his income by real estate speculation.

Morgans was the leader of the Whig Party in the Seventh Ward of New York.

He was elected assistant alderman in 1849, and represented the ward as alderman from 1850 to 1851. During his term as alderman, he was president of the board of aldermen, and was Acting Mayor during the temporary absence of Ambrose Kingsland.

In 1852, he was nominated by the Whigs as a candidate for mayor of New York City, but lost to Jacob Aaron Westervelt.

He retired from his business in 1857.

In 1859, he moved to Stamford, Connecticut, where he built a residence.

He lived in Connecticut for eight years, and during that time was a member of both the Connecticut House and Connecticut Senate.

Upon leaving Connecticut, he settled in Cutchogue, New York, where he had previously spent his summers.

He remained in Cutchogue until the death of his wife, after which he lived with his son James at 373 Monroe Street in Brooklyn until his death.

References 

1806 births
1889 deaths
Connecticut state senators
Connecticut Whigs
19th-century American politicians
Mayors of New York City
American metalsmiths
New York City Council members
New York (state) Whigs
Politicians from Stamford, Connecticut
People from Cutchogue, New York